Lipscombe is a surname. Notable people with the surname include:

 Diane Lipscombe (born 1960), British neuroscientist
 Edward Hart Lipscombe (born 1858), American educator and religious leader
 Jesse Lipscombe (born 1980), Canadian actor
 Lorraine Lipscombe, Canadian endocrinologist
 Lydia Lipscombe (born 1979), New Zealand female swimmer
 Nick Lipscombe (born 1958), British military historian

See also 

 Lipscomb (surname)